Holcocera cerradicola is a moth in the family Blastobasidae. It is found in the Brazilian cerrado in Paraná.

The length of the forewings is 7.2–9.2 mm. The forewings are pale brownish grey intermixed with dark brownish-grey scales and scales tipped with white. The hindwings are translucent near the base, gradually darkening to the brown apex.

The larvae feed on the fruits of Bauhinia holophylla and Stryphnodendron adstringens.

Etymology
The species epithet, cerradicola, is derived from the root cerrado (the habitat from where the type series was collected) and the Latin suffix -cola (meaning inhabitant of).

References

Moths described in 2008
cerradicola